Cheruthuruthy also known as Vallathol Nagar is a small town in India near Wadakkanchery, Thrissur on the banks of the Nila (Bharathapuzha) river.

Administration
Falls in Talappilly taluk (Wadakkanchery) of the revenue district of Thrissur. Thrissur is 30 km from Cheruthuruthy. It is situated on the banks of the Nila river (Bharathapuzha). It is a serene and scenic small town.

Kalamandalam University

The striking attraction of Cheruthuruthy is the Kerala Kalamandalam. It is started in the year 1930 to teach Kerala, performance arts like Kathakali, Mohiniyattam, Thullal, Koothu, Folk Dances, Panchavadyam and Drama. Recently, it has been recognized as a Deemed University by the Government of India. Many persons trained here have achieved national and international acclaim. It follows the residential schooling system and caste is not at all a criterion for admission.

Poet Vallathol
Mahakavi Vallathol Narayana Menon played a primary role in setting up the Kalamandalam. His Samadhi is in the old Kalamandalam campus. For those who want to have a glimpse at his contributions to the cultural world, a visit to the Vallathol Museum at Cheruthuruthy is a must. Another thing Kalamandalam can boast about is the ‘Koothambalam’, i.e., the special hall for performing the ritual and classical dances like koothu and koodiyattam. Since the old times, Koothambalams are considered very sacred and were built only in temple premises. Kalamandalam is the only exemption where the ‘Koothamabalam’ is not in the temple premises.

Temples
Kozhimamparambu Bhagavathy temple, Nedumpura Kulasekharanellur Siva temple, Nedumpura Chirakkulangara temple, Kaipanchery Narasimhamoorthy temple, Pangavu Siva temple, St. Thomas Church and JumaMosque are some other attractions in Cheruthuruthy. Another place to visit in Cheruthuruthy is the Palace of Kochi Maharaja which has recently been converted into a 3-star Ayurvedic Heritage Resort named The River Retreat. The Palace of ‘Kavalapara Mooppil Nair’ is located 8 km from Cheruthuruthy. Another worth watching pilgrimage place in Cheruthuruthy is the Shiva temple, a fitting example of Kerala’s traditional architecture. Kozhimamparambu pooram is one of the highest crowded pooram in Thrissur. The Pooram festival is conducted during early summer(Feb/March) every year. Seven teams, each from neighboring village temples Panjal, Pudussery, Nedumpura, Cheruthuruthy, Pallikkal, Thazhapra-Vettikkattiri and Attoor participate in Kozhimamparambu Pooram

Education
The Govt. of India's Panchakarma ayurveda research centre, Jyothi engineering college and PNNM medical college ais situated in Cheruthuruthy. The best time to visit Cheruthuruthy is in December, for a chance to watch a week-long dance festival organized by Kalamandalam. Thrissur, Vallathol Nagar (Cheruthuruthy), and Wadakkanchery Railway Stations and Shoranur Railway Junction are very near to Cheruthuruthy.

Major Landmarks
 Kerala Kalamandalam
 PNNM Ayurvedic Medical College
Cherthuruthy Jummah mosque
Government Higher Secondary School
 Pangavu Shiva Temple
 Kozhimamparambu Temple
 Nedumpura Siva Temple
 Kochin Bridge
 Vallathole Museum
 Nedumpura MVM LP School

References 

Villages in Thrissur district